Graham Hunter (26 October 1945 – 11 December 2009) was an  Australian rules footballer who played with Geelong in the Victorian Football League (VFL).

Notes

External links 

1945 births
2009 deaths
Australian rules footballers from Victoria (Australia)
Geelong Football Club players
Geelong West Football Club players